"Clementine" is a song by American singer Halsey. It was released on September 29, 2019, her twenty-fifth birthday, through Capitol Records as the first promotional single from her third studio album, Manic (2020).

Background and composition 
Written by Halsey, Jasper Sheff and Johnathan Carter Cunnigham, "Clementine" is a "stripped-back track, driven by simple piano tinkling and some subtle clunking for percussion". Halsey released the song on her twenty-fifth birthday.

Critical reception 
Whitney Shoemaker from Alternative Press wrote that "Halsey strips things down in her raw new track". Mike Nied of Idolator wrote that the track "finds her at her most poetic over sparse keys", while writing that the song "doesn't exactly scream radio hit".

Music video 
The music video for "Clementine" was released with the song on September 29, 2019. The video shows Halsey and her brother Sévian performing interpretive dance in an aquarium. The video was directed by Anton Tammi and Dani Vitale who also did the choreography.

Credits and personnel 
Credits adapted from Tidal.

 Halsey – producer, songwriting, vocals
 John Cunnigham – producer, songwriting, programming
 Jasper Sheff – songwriting
 Serban Ghenea – mixer, studio personnel
 John Hanes – mix engineer, studio personnel
 Chris Gehringer – mastering engineer, studio personnel
 Will Quinnell – assistant mastering engineer, studio personnel
 Aria McKnight – A&R
 Jeremy Vuernick – A&R
 Ryan Del Vecchio – A&R Admin

Release history

References 

2019 singles
2019 songs
Halsey (singer) songs
Capitol Records singles
Songs written by Halsey (singer)